The Irish Connection 2 is the fifteenth studio album by Australian-born Irish singer and composer Johnny Logan. The album was released in December 2012 and charted in Denmark and Norway. The album is the "sister" album of Logan's 2007 release The Irish Connection.

Track listing

Charts

References

Johnny Logan (singer) albums
2012 albums
Covers albums